Paul Gordon (born 1 March 1990) is an Irish hurler who currently plays as a centre-back for the Galway senior team.

Gordon made his first appearance for the senior team during the 2012 championship and immediately became a regular member of the panel.  An All-Ireland medalist in the under-21 grade, Gordon has won two Leinster medal in the senior grade as a playing substitute.

At club level Gordon plays with the Tynagh-Abbey-Duniry Club.

References

1990 births
Living people
Tynagh-Abbey/Duniry hurlers
Galway inter-county hurlers
University of Galway hurlers
Connacht inter-provincial hurlers